Harpullia ramiflora, commonly known as the Claudie tulipwood or Cape York tulipwood, is a tree in the Sapindaceae family native to north east Queensland, New Guinea and parts of Malesia.

Description

The inflorescences are initially axillary, later as the leaves fall they become ramiflorous.

Each valve contains a single black seed which is almost or completely covered by a bright yellow aril.

Phenology
In Australia, flowering occurs from October to July, and fruits ripen from April to November.

Taxonomy
This species was first described in 1877 by the German botanist Ludwig Adolph Timotheus Radlkofer. His paper, titled "Über die Sapindaceen Holländisch-Indiens", was published in 1879 in the work Actes du congrès international de botanistes, d'horticulteurs, de négociants et de fabricants de produits du règne végétal tenu à Amsterdam en 1877.

Distribution and habitat
Harpullia ramiflora is native to the island of Catanduanes in the Philippines, the island of Halmahera and the Aru Islands in the Maluku Islands, New Guinea, and Cape York Peninsula in Australia. It grows in rainforest and gallery forest.

In Australia the range of this species was originally from the top of Cape York to near Rossville, but after extensive planting throughout the city of Cairns it has become naturalised in the areas around the city.

Gallery

References

External links
 
 
 View a map of historical sightings of this species at the Australasian Virtual Herbarium
 View observations of this species on iNaturalist
 View images of this species on Flickriver

ramiflora
Trees of the Philippines
Trees of the Maluku Islands
Trees of New Guinea
Trees of Australia
Sapindales of Australia
Flora of Queensland
Taxa named by Ludwig Adolph Timotheus Radlkofer
Plants described in 1877